Kyle Frazer Taylor (born 26 May 1999) is an English professional footballer who plays as a midfielder for  club Exeter City.

Career

AFC Bournemouth
After signing for Bournemouth as a schoolboy, Taylor signed a six-year youth contract with the club aged 12. Taylor made his professional debut for Bournemouth on 17 January 2018, coming on in the 87th minute for Andrew Surman in a 3–0 defeat to Wigan Athletic in the third round of the FA Cup. In February 2018, Taylor signed a new deal at Bournemouth, which contracted him to the club until June 2020.
Taylor made his second appearance, and full debut, for Bournemouth on 5 January 2019, playing the first 45 minutes of a 1–3 FA Cup home defeat to Brighton & Hove Albion, before being replaced by David Brooks.

Loan to Forest Green Rovers
On 30 August 2019, he joined Forest Green Rovers on a season-long loan. On 6 January 2020, Taylor was recalled from his loan spell with Forest Green Rovers, having made a total of 10 appearances across all competitions.

Loan to Southend United
On 25 September 2020, Taylor joined League Two side Southend United on loan until January 2021. On 12 January 2021, it was announced that Taylor’s loan with Southend United had been extended until the end of the 2020–21 season.

Career statistics

Personal life
Taylor born in Switzerland. He is the half-brother of the English/French comedian Paul Taylor; his Uncle, Mark Patrick Taylor is Victoria's (Australia) Chief Environmental Scientist (https://www.epa.vic.gov.au/about-epa/governance/chief-environmental-scientist).

Honours
Exeter City
League Two runner-up: 2021–22

References

External links

Kyle Taylor Player Profile on the Exeter City website

1999 births
Living people
English footballers
Sportspeople from Poole
Footballers from Dorset
Association football midfielders
AFC Bournemouth players
Forest Green Rovers F.C. players
Southend United F.C. players
English Football League players